Reykholt may refer to the following places in Iceland:
Reykholt, Southern Iceland, village on the Golden Circle
Reykholt, Western Iceland, home of Snorri Sturluson